FWSE may mean:

 Famous web search engine, a nickname for Google's internet search engine
 Fast Wide Single-Ended, an implementation of SCSI that uses Fast SCSI, Wide SCSI and Single-Ended electrical layout
 Fixed Wing Single Engine aircraft, a type of aircraft with fixed wings (not a rotorcraft) and one engine; for examples of the type, see :Category:Single-engine aircraft